Bernd Schröder (born 22 July 1942) is a German football manager. He is best known as the manager of the women's Bundesliga side 1. FFC Turbine Potsdam from 1971 to 2016.

Career 
Bernd Schröder was a goalkeeper and played for various clubs in Leipzig. In 1971, he became the first manager of the women's team of the BSG Turbine Potsdam. He led the team for six GDR championships. In 1990, he was the manager of the GDR women's national team that played only one match. After the 1991–92 season he resigned as manager and became the club's president. He returned to Turbine's bench in late 1997. He won the UEFA Women's Cup in 2005, the German championship in 2004, 2006, 2009, 2010, 2011 and 2012 and the German cup in 2004, 2005 and 2006.

References

External links 
 Official homepage of 1. FFC Turbine Potsdam

1942 births
Living people
Sportspeople from Lübeck
German footballers
German football managers
1. FFC Turbine Potsdam
Association football goalkeepers
Footballers from Saxony
Sportspeople from Freiberg
People from Bezirk Karl-Marx-Stadt
Women's association football managers
East German footballers